Kinnoul is a rural locality in the Shire of Banana, Queensland, Australia. In the  Kinnoul had a population of 69 people.

Geography 
The locality is bounded to the south in parts by the Dawson River.

Lynd Range extends from neighbouring Broadmere to the north into Kinnoul.

The land use is predominantly grazing on native vegetation with some crop growing.

History 

The locality was officially named and bounded on 20 May 2005. However, the name has been in use since at least 1862 where it was part of a mail route from Taroom to Bungeworgorai. It probably takes its name from the Kinnoul pastoral lease taken out by Robert Miller and John Turnbull in 1851.

In the  Kinnoul had a population of 69 people.

Economy 
There are a number of homesteads in the locality:

 Greenoaks
 Kinfauns
 Kinnoul
 Wilga Park

Transport 
Cowangah pastoral run has an airstrip.

Yurnga pastoral run has an airstrip.

Education 
There are no schools in Kinnoul. The nearest school is Taroom State School in neighbouring Taroom to the east; it provides primary schooling and secondary schooling to Year 10. There are no nearby schools providing secondary schooling to Year 12. Distance education or boarding schools are options.

References 

Shire of Banana
Localities in Queensland